Santa Rosa River is a river of Acre state in western Brazil, a tributary of the Purus River.

The river defines the boundary between Peru and Brazil in the centre of the state of Acre, then runs for a short distance along the boundary of the  Santa Rosa do Purus National Forest, a sustainable use conservation unit created in 2001, until it joins the Purus River opposite the community of Santa Rosa do Purus.

See also
List of rivers of Acre

References

Brazilian Ministry of Transport

Rivers of Acre (state)